Richard Thomas Correll (born May 14, 1948) is an American television actor, director, producer and writer.

Life and career
Born in Los Angeles County, California, Correll is the son of Charles Correll, who starred as Andy Brown on the radio program Amos 'n' Andy. He is the brother of Barbara Correll, Dottie Correll and Charles Correll Jr., who worked on Animal House as cinematographer and directed episodes of Without a Trace, CSI: Miami, CSI: Crime Scene Investigation, Beverly Hills, 90210, Melrose Place and Stargate SG-1.

As a child actor, Correll played the role of Beaver's friend Richard Rickover during the last three seasons of Leave It to Beaver (1960–63). He also appeared in multiple episodes of The Adventures of Ozzie and Harriet, Lassie and National Velvet. As a teenager, Correll became a close friend of legendary silent film comedian Harold Lloyd and his family, and volunteered to assist Lloyd in preserving and archiving Lloyd's extensive films. He continues this work today, and is credited as the chief archivist for the Lloyd Trust. He has shared his encyclopedic knowledge of Lloyd's work and life in interviews and commentary tracks for the 2005 DVD release of Lloyd's films, and in the 1991 documentary The Third Genius.

In 1983, as a result of a revival of the Leave It to Beaver series on television and film, Correll appeared on the Match Game-Hollywood Squares Hour as a game show participant / celebrity guest star.

Correll made his film directorial debut with Ski Patrol.

Correll has directed episodes of The Suite Life on Deck, The Suite Life of Zack & Cody, Family Matters, What I Like About You, That's So Raven, So Little Time, The Amanda Show, The Hogan Family, Yes, Dear, Two of a Kind, Fuller House and many other series. He is also the co-creator of the Disney Channel original series, Hannah Montana.

In 2010, Correll sued Disney for unfair termination and alleged non-payment of creative royalties for Hannah Montana.

Correll owns an extensive collection of  science-fiction, fantasy, and horror film artifacts, which are shown at his Icons of Darkness exhibit in Hollywood.

Filmography

Actor
 The DuPont Show with June Allyson (1 episode, 1960)
 The Dick Powell Show (1 episode-1961)
 Leave It to Beaver (39 episodes, 1960–1962)
 The Adventures of Ozzie and Harriet (3 episodes,1960-1961)
 The Blue Angels (1 episode- 1961)
 The Betty Hutton Show (3 episodes-1959-1960)
 Bonanza (1 episode, 1961)
 Lassie (5 episodes, 1961-1964)
 National Velvet (3 episodes, 1961–1962)
 The Many Loves of Dobie Gillis (1 episode, 1962)
 Still the Beaver (Television film, 1984)
 The New Leave It to Beaver (4 episodes, 1984)
 Family Matters (2 episodes,1996-1997)
 The Suite Life of Zack & Cody (2007, 2 episodes)

Producer
 Police Squad! (6 episodes, 1982)
 Bosom Buddies  (Pilot, 1980)
 The Hogan Family (51 episodes, 1986-1989)
 Full House (Pilot, 1987)
 Step by Step (71 episodes, 1991-1995)
 Mostly Ghostly: Have You Met My Ghoulfriend? (2014) (executive producer)

Writer
 Happy Days (5 episodes- 1982)
 Hannah Montana (98 episodes, 2006–2011)
 Mostly Ghostly: Who Let the Ghosts Out? (2008)
 Hannah Montana: The Movie (2009)
 Mostly Ghostly: Have You Met My Ghoulfriend? (2014)

Director

 Ski Patrol (1990)
 The Hogan Family (1987–1990, 46 episodes)
 Going Places (7 episodes, 1990–1991)
 The Family Man (18 episodes, 1990)
 Perfect Strangers (14 episodes, 1990)
 Scorch (Pilot, 1992)
 Full House (14 episodes, 1987–1992)
 Getting By (Unknown episodes, 1993)
 Sister, Sister (Pilot-1994)
 On Our Own (13 episodes, 1994)
 Step by Step (Pilot-1991)
 Step by Step (56 episodes, 1991–1995)
 Kirk (12 episodes, 1995)
 Brotherly Love (1 episode, 1997)
 Life with Roger (16 episodes, 1996)
 Girls Across the Lake (Unknown episodes, 1997)
 Married... with Children (1 episode, 1997)
 Meego (12 episodes, 1997)
 Family Matters (91 episodes, 1989–1998)
 Holding the Baby (12 episodes, 1998)
 Two of a Kind (14 of the 22 episodes, 1998-1999)
 Scorch (Pilot - 1998)
 Guys Like Us (12 episodes, 1998)
 The Norm Show (1 episode, 1999)
 Grown Ups (17 episodes, 1999)
 The Amanda Show (16 episodes, 2000–2001)
 Hype (13 Episodes 2000-2001)
 Yes, Dear (3 episodes, 2000–2001)
 So Little Time (12 episodes, 2001–2002)
 Reba (1 episode, 2002)
 All That (17 episodes, 2003)
 That's So Raven (52 episodes, 2003–2006)
 What I Like About You (2 episodes, 2004)
 The Suite Life of Zack & Cody (58 episodes, 2005–2008)
 Arwin! (Unsold Disney Channel pilot, 2007)
 Hannah Montana (34 episodes, 2007–2008)
 Cory in the House (13 episodes, 2007–2008)
 The Suite Life on Deck (36 episodes, 2008)
 Mostly Ghostly (2008)
 I'm in the Band (4 episodes, 2010)
 Are We There Yet? (4 episodes, 2011)
 How to Rock (3 episodes, 2011)
 A.N.T. Farm (28 episodes, 2012)
 See Dad Run (9 episodes, 2012–2014)
 Jessie  (32 episodes, 2012–2015)
 Liv and Maddie (3 episodes, 2014)
 Partners (6 episodes, 2014)
 Austin & Ally  (2 episodes, 2014)
 Mighty Med (6 episodes, 2014–2015)
 K.C. Undercover (2 episodes, 2015)
 Lab Rats (1 episode, 2015)
 Bunk'd  (11 episodes, 2015–present)
 Fuller House (34 episodes, 2016–2020)
 Raven's Home (5 episodes, 2019-2020)
 The Girl Who Believes in Miracles (2021)

References

External links
 

1948 births
Living people
American male child actors
American male television actors
American television directors
Television producers from California
American television writers
American male television writers
Male actors from Los Angeles County, California
Film directors from California
Screenwriters from California